| tries = {{#expr:
 + 1 + 5 + 6 + 1 + 2 + 6 +  2 + 4 + 3
 + 4 + 5 + 6 + 4 + 5 + 9 +  2 + 1 + 4
 + 4 + 5 + 5 + 4 + 4 + 2 +  3 + 2 + 2
 + 1 + 2 + 2 + 3 + 4 + 2 + 10 + 5 + 1
 + 1 + 3 + 1 + 2 + 1 + 2 +  7 + 1 + 3
 + 1 + 2 + 3 + 6 + 6 + 2 +  7 + 5 + 4
 + 2 + 2 + 0 + 4 + 6 + 6 +  6 + 7 + 6
 + 5 + 2 + 3 + 4 + 3 + 2 +  8 + 3 + 0
 + 2 + 3 + 5 + 5 + 1 + 1 +  3 + 6 + 3
 + 5 + 8 + 7 + 3 + 6 + 8 +  7 + 5 + 6
}}
| top point scorer = Dan Parks (Glasgow)(159 points)
| top try scorer = Tom James (Cardiff Blues)(9 tries)
| website = www.rabodirectpro12.com
| prevseason = 2006–07
| nextseason = 2008–09
}}
The 2007–08 Celtic League (known as the 2007–08 Magners League for sponsorship reasons) was the seventh Celtic League season and the second with Magners as title sponsor. The season began on 31 August 2007 and finished on the weekend beginning 10 May 2008. Some disruption to fixtures occurred as a result of the 2007 Rugby World Cup, which took place during September and October 2007.

The teams competing were the same as the previous season with one exception; only two Scottish teams participated, as the Scottish Rugby Union scrapped the Border Reivers region at the end of the 2006–07 season. As in previous seasons, the league was played on a home and away basis, with teams earning four points for a win, and a bonus point for scoring four or more tries in a match. The losing team may also earn a bonus point if they lose by seven points or less. The losing bonus point system is intended to ensure that both teams compete fully in all matches.

The ten teams competing were the four Irish provinces: Munster, Leinster, Connacht and Ulster; two Scottish regions: Edinburgh Rugby and Glasgow Warriors; and four Welsh regions: Llanelli Scarlets, Cardiff Blues, Ospreys and Newport Gwent Dragons.

Teams

Pre-season
Following the end of the 2006–07 Celtic League season, a number of controversial events occurred in Celtic rugby. Mike Phillips moved from the Cardiff Blues to the Ospreys, in a move that would earn him £180,000 a year. The Border Reivers was officially closed as a rugby club, and Edinburgh Rugby were almost expelled from the competition, because of a row with the Scottish Rugby Union.

As a result of increased revenue from governing bodies and TV rights, most clubs were able to expand their squads with the signing of several new players.

Table

Results
A provisional fixture list was released on 23 July 2007, with the opening game featuring Cardiff Blues and the Ospreys.

Welsh Round 1
 All-Welsh Round 5 matches played early to allow Welsh teams to play in the Anglo-Welsh Cup.

Welsh Round 2
 All-Welsh Round 6 matches played early to allow Welsh teams to play in the Anglo-Welsh Cup.

Round 1

Round 2

Round 3

Round 4

Round 5

Round 6

Round 7

Round 8

Round 9

1872 Cup 1st round

Welsh Round 3
 All-Welsh Round 8 matches rescheduled to allow Welsh teams to play in the Anglo-Welsh Cup.

Round 10

Round 11

Round 12

Round 13

Round 14

Round 15

1872 Cup 2nd round

Round 16

Rearranged fixtures
 Round 13 match postponed from 22 March because of the Ospreys' participation in the Anglo-Welsh Cup semi-final

 Round 10 match postponed from 4 January because of adverse weather conditions at Ravenhill.

Round 17

Rearranged fixture
 Round 15 match postponed from 12 April because of the Ospreys' participation in the Anglo-Welsh Cup final.

Round 18

Leading scorers
Note: Flags to the left of player names indicate national team as has been defined under IRB eligibility rules, or primary nationality for players who have not yet earned international senior caps. Players may hold one or more non-IRB nationalities.

Top points scorers

Top try scorers

Broadcast rights
Television rights for the league were split between three broadcasters: BBC Wales, S4C and Setanta Sports. BBC Wales and S4C continued to cover the Celtic League until the end of the 2009–10 season.

Notes

References

 
2007-08
 
2007–08 in Irish rugby union
2007–08 in Welsh rugby union
2007–08 in Scottish rugby union